The Bad News Bears is an American sitcom that aired on CBS from March 24, 1979, until July 26, 1980, consisting of 26 episodes (three unaired by CBS). It was based on the 1976 film of the same name, that was followed by two sequels in 1977 and 1978.

Synopsis
In the television series, Jack Warden portrayed former minor-leaguer Morris Buttermaker, the coach of the Hoover Junior High Bears, a team of young adolescents with poor skills and little ability to play baseball. Catherine Hicks played the role of Hoover Junior High principal Dr. Emily Rappant, Phillip Richard Allen played Roy Turner, the coach of the rival team the Lions. Corey Feldman, Billy Jayne (then credited as Billy Jacoby) and Meeno Peluce were cast amongst the team's players, and Tricia Cast played Amanda Wurlitzer, the Bears' talented pitcher.

The series was originally scheduled on Saturday nights at 8:00 p.m. In September 1979, it was moved to 8:30 p.m. Three episodes into the series' second season, CBS canceled The Bad News Bears due to low ratings. When the CBS broadcast unaired episodes in June 1980 it was moved back to 8:00 p.m. One month later, the series was again moved to the 8:30 timeslot, but by then audiences were confused by the frequent time changes and stopped tuning in.

Cast
 Jack Warden ...  Morris Buttermaker 
 Catherine Hicks ...  Dr. Emily Rappant 
 Phillip Richard Allen ...  Roy Turner 
 Sparky Marcus ...  Leslie Ogilvie 
 Meeno Peluce ...  Tanner Boyle 
 Billy Jayne ...  Rudi Stein 
 Corey Feldman ...  Regi Tower 
 Shane Butterworth ...  Timmy Lupus 
 Kristoff St. John ...  Ahmad Abdul Rahim 
 J. Brennan Smith ...  Mike Engelberg 
 Charles Nunez ...  Miguel Agilar 
 Danny Nunez ...  Jose Agilar 
 Tricia Cast ...  Amanda Wurlitzer  
 Bill Lazarus ...  Frosty 
 Gregg Forrest ...  Kelly Leak 
 Rad Daly ...  Josh Matthews 
 Persephanie Silverthorn ...  Student 
 Sherrie Wills ...  Marsha

Episodes

Season 1: 1979

Season 2: 1979–80

Syndication
In the late 1980s, the show was occasionally rerun on Nickelodeon and Nick at Nite. In the early 1990s, it was rerun on Comedy Central.

Home media
Visual Entertainment released the complete series on DVD in Region 1 in October 2018.

References

External links
 

Bad News Bears (franchise)
1979 American television series debuts
1980 American television series endings
1970s American sitcoms
1980s American sitcoms
American sports television series
Baseball television series
CBS original programming
English-language television shows
Television series by CBS Studios
Live action television shows based on films
Television shows set in Los Angeles